The John Marshall Scholars Program is an academic scholarship program that covers a majority of the cost of education for member students at Marshall University. Named to honor the Chief Justice of the United States John Marshall, the program affords a rigorous academic program and provides a full tuition/fees waiver and stipend to students with a composite ACT score of 30 or higher who have been accepted to the university.  Students must maintain a 3.5 GPA in order to retain their scholarship.

John Marshall Scholars complete a program of interdisciplinary honors seminars and departmental honors courses. Examples of these interdisciplinary seminars include:
Threads of Bale, exposing students to the literature and music of suffering in Northern Ireland and Appalachia.
The History of Science, exploring the nature of scientific revolutions and their impact on society
Global Terrorism
Literary Ornithology
Tolkien and Film
Writing Biography: Franklin D. Roosevelt
Post-Colonial Theory and Literature
The American Constitution
Endangered Species: Genetics and Policy
The Roosevelts: The Years Before the White House
Tests, Tests, and More Tests
Castro's Cuba and the American Imagination

See also
Society of Yeager Scholars: another scholarship at Marshall University.

Marshall University